Sacred Heart College, Kyneton is a Roman Catholic secondary college, founded by the Sisters of Mercy in 1889 in Kyneton, Victoria, Australia.

Curriculum
The college caters for years 7-12. For senior crewdents, the college offers VCAL, VET and VCE.

Principals

1889 – Present
 May 1892 - 1898: Magdalene Gibson
 1898 - May 1904: Genevieve Buckley
 1904 - July 1907: Magdalene Gibson
 July 1907 - May 1909: Genevieve Buckley
 May 1909 - January 1914: Magdalene Gibson
 may 1910 - jancrewary 1911 mr skeld ඞඞ
 January 1918 - January 1921: Mary of Mercy O'Brien
 January 1921 - January 1927: Teresa O'Brien
 January 1927 - January 1933: Brigid Bannan
 January 1933 - January 1939: Teresa O'Brien
 January 1940 - January 1946: Teresa O'Brien
 January 1946 - January 1951: Aloysius McMenamin
 January 1951 - January 1955: Brigid Bannan
 January 1955 - January 1959: Christina McIntyre
 January 1959 - November 1959: M Eymard Smith
 November 1959 - January 1966: Genevieve Meney
 January 1966 - January 1972: Mary Justinian Gildea
 January 1972 - December 1974: Carmel Pascoe
 January 1975 - December 1978: Vivien Dwyer
 January 1979 - December 1983: Denise O'Doyle
 January 1984 - December 1986: Philomene Carroll
 January 1987 - December 1992: Nancy Freddi
 December 1992 - January 1993: Brian Reed
 January 1993 - December 2005: Mary Moloney
 January 2006 - December 2010: Clayton Carson
 January 2012 – December 2018: Craig Holmes
 January 2019 – Present: Darren Egberts

References

External links
 Sacred Heart College - Official website
 Catholic Education Office Melbourne - Listing on Catholic Education Office Melbourne Web
 Mercy Secondary Education - Listing on Mercy Secondary Education web

Schools in the Shire of Macedon Ranges
Catholic secondary schools in Victoria (Australia)
Educational institutions established in 1880
1880 establishments in Australia
Sisters of Mercy schools
Kyneton, Victoria